Colonel Russell Potter "Red" Reeder Jr. (March 4, 1902 – February 22, 1998) was a United States Army officer and writer.

Biography
Reeder was born in Fort Leavenworth, Kansas, on March 4, 1902. His father, Russell Potter Reeder, Sr., was an officer in the United States Army. Reeder and his family moved to different military bases around the country. He wrote about his army upbringing in the book Born at Reveille. At the age of eleven, he saved the life of a drowning younger child in Casco Bay, Maine. For this achievement, he was awarded the Treasury Department Silver Lifesaving Medal. Reeder entered West Point in 1920, played football and baseball as a cadet, and graduated as a member of the Class of 1926.

During the attack on Pearl Harbor, Reeder was stationed in California. Later in 1941, he was transferred to the War Department Operations Division, on Chief of Staff General George C. Marshall's general staff in Washington, D.C.  In 1943, Reeder prepared a staff study proposing a "ground medal" comparable to the "Air Medal" already being given for "meritorious service while in 'aerial flight.'" The report presented to Lieutenant General Lesley McNair, then in charge of the Army Ground Forces, was forwarded to General Marshall and resulted in the creation of the Bronze Star Medal by President Franklin D. Roosevelt in February 1944.

In April 1944, Reeder was assigned to command the 12th Infantry Regiment within the Fourth Infantry Division. Reeder's regiment of 3,200 soldiers fought on Utah Beach during D-Day. On June 11, 1944, during the Battle of Normandy, Reeder received a shrapnel wound in his ankle that almost severed his left leg. Reeder was taken back to England, and from there was taken to the Walter Reed Army Hospital in Washington and his leg was amputated.

After retiring from military service in 1946, Reeder became an athletic director at West Point. He quit this job after 20 years in 1967 and pursued a career in nonfiction writing. Of his nonfiction works, Medal of Honor Heroes and The West Point Story were written for the Landmark series of historical literature for children.  Reeders other titles include "The Civil War Story," "The Northern Generals," and "The Southern Generals."  His narrative account of Colonel Ranald S. Mackenzie's May 19, 1873 black operation against Mexican bandits titled "The Mackenzie Raid" served as the inspiration for a 39-episode television series first aired in 1958 titled Mackenzie's Raiders.

Reeder's sister Nardi Reeder Campion  was an author and co-wrote Marty Maher's Bringing Up the Brass that was filmed as The Long Grey Line with Nardi co-writing the screenplay. Red Reeder had a cameo as the Commandant of Cadets in the film, distributing diplomas to the class of 1915.

In 1997, Reeder was awarded the Distinguished Graduate Award by the Association of Graduates of the United States Military Academy.  Reeder died in Alexandria, Virginia, on February 22, 1998, at the age of 95. He survived his wife and younger sister, and has four children, ten grandchildren, and twenty-two great-grandchildren.

Decorations
Colonel Reeder's military decorations include the Distinguished Service Cross, the Silver Star, the Legion of Merit, the Bronze Star, the Purple Heart, the Combat Infantryman Badge, and two decorations awarded by France: the Croix de Guerre avec Palm and the Légion d'honneur.

References

External links

1902 births
1998 deaths
United States Army Infantry Branch personnel
Military personnel from Kansas
United States Army colonels
People from Leavenworth, Kansas
United States Military Academy alumni
Army Black Knights football players
United States Army personnel of World War II
20th-century American novelists
American male novelists
American autobiographers
Recipients of the Distinguished Service Cross (United States)
Recipients of the Silver Star
Recipients of the Legion of Merit
Recipients of the Legion of Honour
Recipients of the Croix de Guerre (France)
20th-century American male writers
20th-century American non-fiction writers
American male non-fiction writers